The 2009–10 season was Leicester City F.C.'s 105th season in the English football league system and their 58th in the second tier of English football. It was their first season back in the Championship after promotion from League One as champions in 2008–09. It was also the club's 125th anniversary season.

Having just been promoted, Nigel Pearson's side surprised many by spending most of the season in the play-offs. They eventually finished fifth, reaching the play-offs. This was considered an impressive finish and a stride forward by many, considering Leicester were relegated from the same division two seasons previously. They eventually lost out in the play-off semi-finals to Cardiff City on a penalty shoot-out.

Pre-season
After winning League One by seven points, manager Nigel Pearson sought to strengthen the squad ahead of the Championship campaign. 2008–09 loanees Jack Hobbs and Wayne Brown were quickly signed on permanent deals from Liverpool and Hull City respectively. Veterans Barry Hayles, Bruno Ngotty, Paul Henderson, Patrick Kisnorbo and Marc Edworthy were released at the end of their contracts. The Foxes further added to their squad with the captures of goalkeeper Chris Weale, defender Robbie Neilson and midfielders Richie Wellens and Dany N'Guessan. However, the forward line remained unreinforced until 19-year-old Martyn Waghorn arrived on loan from Sunderland just before the opening game against Swansea City.

Joe Mattock, part of the England squad for the European U-19 Championships, handed in a transfer request just 48 hours before the first match of the season. He eventually moved to fellow Championship club West Bromwich Albion for an undisclosed fee.

Kit and sponsorship

Leicester City's home kit for the 2009–10 season was unveiled before the final home game of 2008–09 against Scunthorpe United. To mark the 125th anniversary of the club's founding in 1884, the design of the front of the shirt had earlier been put to an online vote, with the fans deciding to keep the home shirt blank and sponsorless. A special badge was created for this kit, to be used for one season only.

The blue and black design of the away kit mirrors the shirts worn in the club's first game in 1884. It is branded with the logo of LOROS, a charity providing hospice care in Leicestershire. The charity will receive a percentage of the sale price of each shirt sold from their shops.

Both strips are manufactured by Joma, following the expiration of the club's previous deal with Jako.

Friendlies
After reporting back for pre-season training on 1 July, the club remained unbeaten through six pre-season games:

Record
2009–10 was Leicester City's 58th season at the second tier of English football. Their record of winning the division on six occasions (although not since 1980) is second only to Manchester City. Prior to the 2009–10 season, their record at this level was:

Players

2009–10 squad
Only includes players given a squad number. The squad listed is the squad which Leicester finished the season with.

Transfers

In

Out

Loans in

Loans out

Results

Football League Championship
Leicester City scores given first

Football League Championship play-offs
Leicester City scores given first
Away goals do not count.

FA Cup
Leicester City scores given first

League Cup
Leicester City scores given first

Awards

Club awards
At the end of the season, Leicester's annual award ceremony including categories voted for by the players and backroom staff, the supporters and the supporters club, saw the following players recognised for their achievements for the club throughout the 2009–10 season.

Divisional awards

Championship statistics

Championship table

Club standings

Club statistics

Appearances

Note:
Substitute appearances given in brackets.
Asterisk indicates player left the club mid-season.

Top scorers

Most assists

Disciplinary record

All Stats obtained from LCFC.com

References

Leicester City F.C. seasons
Leicester City